Ankit Garg is a police superintendent in Chhattisgarh, India. On 9 October 2010, he led a counterinsurgency operation against Naxalites for which he would later be awarded the Police Medal for Gallantry.

Police Medal for Gallantry
On Republic Day 2012, Ankit Garg was awarded the Police Medal for Gallantry for his role the 2010 raid on Maoist supporters. Human rights activists protested against the Union government for presenting this award.

References

Living people
Indian police chiefs
People from Sirsa, Haryana
People from Chhattisgarh
Year of birth missing (living people)